Vehículos Industriales y Agrícolas, S.A. (or VIASA) was a Spanish automobile company, a division of parent company Construcciones y Auxiliares de Ferrocariles (CAF).

History
The company was founded in Zaragoza in the late 1950s to build agricultural equipment and vehicles Willys Overland Jeeps  under license from Kaiser-Willys.  It was one of three companies specializing in the production of commercial vehicles, two of them, ENASA and AISA, were controlled by the Spanish government through the INI. The third was VIASA, a division of parent company Construcciones y Auxiliares de Ferrocariles (CAF) that built railway cars and locomotives. Production began in 1960, and soon local content of all components was achieved. Vehicles used Perkins and Barreiros gasoline or diesel engines.

In the early 1960s, VIASA also manufactured FIAT models 211R, 411R, and 421R under license.

In 1963, forward control "SV" versions went on sale offering a range of models with sharp-edged bodies with straight sheet metal design to simplify manufacture. These were completely unique from any other Jeep-based vehicles anywhere in the world. All had the same advanced cockpit in pick-up, van, chassis cab, or duplex passenger cabin. This Spanish design utilized the versatility of the Jeep Forward Control platform with a more basic approach to further enhance the utility of the vehicles. The Perkins diesel engine allowed them achieve almost  and to cruise at 100 kilometers per hour (approx 60 mph).

In 1968, VIASA merged with Material Móvil y Construcciones S.A. In 1974, it was absorbed by Motor Ibérica and placed under Ebro trucks. In the early eighties the Viasa vehicles disappeared from the Motor Ibérica catalog, to be replaced by the Nissan Vanette and Nissan Patrol.

See also
Jeep CJ

Notes

Truck manufacturers of Spain
Motor vehicle assembly plants in Spain
Defunct motor vehicle manufacturers of Spain
History of Zaragoza
Companies of Spain
Spanish companies established in 1960
Vehicle manufacturing companies established in 1960
Vehicle manufacturing companies disestablished in 1974
1974 disestablishments in Spain
Jeep
Nissan